Evan Wynn (born June 20, 1962) is a former Wisconsin legislator.

Born in East St. Louis, Illinois, Wynn graduated from Steeleville High School in Steeleville, Illinois. He then attended Murray State University, Parkland College, and later graduated from University of Wisconsin–Whitewater in 2009. He was elected to the Wisconsin State Assembly in 2010. He served in the U.S. Marines Reserve from 1980 to 1984, and the U.S. Army from 1986 to 2006. He is an Iraq War veteran, and a member of the National Rifle Association. Wynn was defeated in the general election held on November 6, 2012, by fellow member of the Wisconsin Assembly Andy Jorgensen.

References

People from East St. Louis, Illinois
Murray State University alumni
University of Wisconsin–Whitewater alumni
1962 births
Living people
Republican Party members of the Wisconsin State Assembly
21st-century American politicians